Vortex machine may refer to:
 Vortex ring gun, a weapon
 Vortex ring toy
 Air vortex cannon, a toy
 Vortex tube, a device for separating gases by temperature

See also
 Vortex generator